Club RTL is a Luxembourgish channel of French language based in Kirchberg, Luxembourg-City, Luxembourg and it was owned by DPG Media and Groupe Rossel, it was originally owned by RTL Group until 31 March 2022. The two principals countries of transmission are Belgium and Luxembourg.

Programs
 Apple, Banana (Kids Television Program Channel) Every Day on 20:00-22:00, Every Sunday of 19:00-22:00.
 Hannah Montana Life with Derek Lizzie McGuire Handy Manny Heroes Mega Mindy DuckTales Aladdin Hercules Phineas and Ferb Lilo & Stitch The Legend of Tarzan Teamo Supremo Stanley My Friends Tigger & Pooh Mickey Mouse Works Disney's House of Mouse Buzz Lightyear of Star Command Brandy & Mr. Whiskers The Buzz on Maggie Mickey Mouse Clubhouse The Replacements Yin Yang Yo! Kick Buttowski: Suburban Daredevil Poochini's Yard Pokémon Beyblade: Metal Fusion Star Wars: The Clone Wars Winx Club The Amazing Spiez! The Simpsons Life Frasier Walker, Texas Ranger MacGyver The Bold and the Beautiful Magnum, P.I. Burn Notice Knight Rider Wallander Caméra Café Falcon Beach Merlin The Sopranos''

External links
 Club RTL

Mass media in Luxembourg
Television channels in Belgium
Television in Luxembourg
French-language television stations in Belgium
Television channels and stations established in 1995
RTL Group
Bertelsmann subsidiaries